Paddy Casey is an Irish singer-songwriter from Crumlin, Dublin.

Biography
He received his first guitar when he was 12 and left home soon after and began busking and gigging for about 12 years. At about the age of 24 he was approached by Sony A&R Scout Hugh Murray at the International Bar in Dublin, while performing at the singer/songwriter night hosted by Dave Murphy. Sony gave Casey some studio time in Sun Studios Dublin where he recorded 9 tracks in 2 days. Sony decided that they liked the tracks so much that they wanted to release them as they were. They offered Paddy a recording contract. He was signed by Sony, and was eventually taken in by U2's management company, Principle Management.

Casey released his first album Amen (So Be It) in 1999. This album was produced by Pat Donne and was certified triple platinum in Ireland and did fairly well worldwide. Casey played a range of different instruments in the short time spent recording it, and the track "Winter's Fire" featured Mundy as a guest guitarist. "Sweet Suburban Sky" surfaced the following year on the soundtrack to the award-winning US TV teen drama Dawson's Creek. Casey received nominations for Best Irish Songwriter and Best Male Singer at the Hot Press Awards. Hot Press readers themselves voted the album Best Debut Album, as well as voting Casey the year's Most Promising Act and nominating him in seven other end of the year categories. Touring saw Casey providing support to artists such as R.E.M., Ian Brown, Ani DiFranco and The Pretenders.

Casey returned in 2003 with the multi-platinum album, Living. It was produced by Fred De Faye, Paddy Casey and Pat Donne. It spawned the Irish Singles Chart hits "Saints and Sinners", "The Lucky One" (in 2003), plus "Bend Down Low" and "Want It Can't Have It" (in 2004). Living spent the majority of the year in the top ten, climbing to the top of the Irish Albums Chart 21 weeks after its initial release. In 2004, he won his first of two consecutive Meteor Irish Music Awards for Best Irish Male. He also garnered good reviews for a performance at that year's Oxegen Festival. 2004 saw Living confirmed as the highest selling Irish album of the year. He had a week-long residency at the Olympia Theatre. The year ended with a sold-out performance at Dublin's RDS.

In 2005, Casey toured extensively in Ireland and abroad; highlights including a headline concert at the Heineken Green Energy Festival and also supported U2 on their Vertigo tour, performing in Ireland, Scotland and Norway.

In 2006, Casey went to Los Angeles, California, United States, to record with George Drakoulias, who had worked at the Def Jam label with Rick Rubin. Recording at Dave Blanco's Studio in North Hollywood, Casey worked there with some renowned musicians such as James Gadson and Steve Ferrone. He returned to Ireland to finish the album in his kitchen. He worked on the rest of the album with the producer Pat Donne. Titled Addicted to Company Pt. 1, it was released in Ireland on 7 September 2007, and in the US on 1 April 2008. In March 2008, MTV US promoted him as MTV Buzzworthy Artist on their TV channel and website and on its student-led brand, MTVU. He toured the album extensively and also toured with KT Tunstall and Augustana amongst others.

On 3 April 2008, Casey performed on the Late Show with David Letterman.

After returning from the US, Casey chose to part ways with Sony and Paul McGuinness, and for the next few years he began writing and recording at home. Deciding that the next album would consist of songs/tracks that were recorded on the day they were written. Once he had a collection he was happy with he called on his old friend Pat Donne began mixing the recordings. In November 2012, he released his first independent album The Secret Life Of. The first single, "Wait", featuring the Shannon Gospel Choir, was released in May 2012. Casey toured in Ireland and abroad for the last few years with frequent visits to Australia, Europe and the Middle East.

In November 2016, Casey released the single "Everything Must Change". This was the first taster taken from Casey's then forthcoming sixth album. Alongside this, he also released a new music video for the single produced by Banjoman Films. In July 2017, Casey released "Turn This Ship Around", the second single from this forthcoming album.

Paddy Casey's double album Turn This Ship Around was released on August 6, 2021. Turn This Ship Around has one side focusing on an array of acoustic songs decorated with strings and piano, and the other side featuring an array of full band tracks that span multiple genres. The album artwork was by filmmaker and artist Sophia Cadogan.

Casey's backing band consists of Tim McGrath (drums), Cion O’Callaghan (percussion), Fiona Melady (keyboards and backing vocals), Saoirse Casey (piano)  John Colbert (bass and backing vocals), Andy Coogan (guitar and backing vocals) and Jonathon O’Halloran (flute and trumpet). Influences cited by Paddy Casey include Duke Ellington, John Martyn, The Waterboys, Prince and Sly & The Family Stone.

Discography

Albums
Amen (So Be It) – 28 June 1999
Living – 17 October 2003
Addicted to Company Pt. 1 – 7 September 2007
The Secret Life of... – 9 November 2012
Songbook (The Best of Paddy Casey) – 10 October 2014
Together with the Dublin Gospel Choir, Casey recorded two songs for the Even Better than the Real Thing Vol. 2 album: a new version of his own "Saints and Sinners", and cover medley featuring Bill Withers' "Grandma's Hands" and Blackstreet's "No Diggity".
Turn This Ship Around - 6 August 2021

Singles

References

External links
Official website
Official website discussion forum
Irishmusiccentral.com
Fansite
Rte.ie
Crumlin Native Paddy Casey comes to the Civic

Irish male singer-songwriters
Musicians from Dublin (city)
Living people
Year of birth missing (living people)
People from Crumlin, Dublin